Mary Johnston was an American novelist.

Mary Johnston may also refer to:
Mary Helen Johnston, American NASA scientist and astronaut
Mary Johnston School of Nursing, see Philippine Christian University

See also
Mary Johnson (disambiguation)
Mary Johnstone, pianist